Megachile alucaba is a species of bee in the family Megachilidae. It was described by Snelling in 1990.

References

alucaba
Insects described in 1990